In mathematics, the Hasse derivative is a generalisation of the derivative which allows the formulation of Taylor's theorem in coordinate rings of algebraic varieties.

Definition
Let k[X] be a polynomial ring over a field k.  The r-th Hasse derivative of Xn is

if n ≥ r and zero otherwise.  In characteristic zero we have

Properties
The Hasse derivative is a generalized derivation on k[X] and extends to a generalized derivation on the function field k(X), satisfying an analogue of the product rule 

and an analogue of the chain rule.

A form of Taylor's theorem holds for a function f defined in terms of a local parameter t on an algebraic variety:

References

 

Differential algebra